Nick Vernier Band's Sessions is a collaborative album by an ensemble containing notable musicians, such as Probyn Gregory, Gerry Beckley (with Jeffrey Foskett), Matt Malley, Paul Jones, Iain Matthews, Emitt Rhodes, Pizza Delivery Boys, Janaki, The Monkees
, and Iason Chronis, among others. The studio group was initiated by musician and record producer Eric Van Den Brink. The album, officially released on iTunes in April 2010, consists of songs by featured collaborators, as well as original material.

The name "Nick Vernier Band" is an anagram of "Eric Van Den Brink".

Track listing
"I'm Your Kingpin" (Paul Jones, Manfred Mann) – The album's opening track showcases some excellent harmonica playing by Paul Jones. Jones also featured on the original version of this British blues classic. Line-up: Eric Van Den Brink: instruments, vocals / Paul Jones: harmonica / Sal Giorgianni: tenor sax
"I Send Up My Prayer" (Probyn Gregory) – Rich in melody and musical texture, "I Send Up My Prayer" can't help but hint at its Californian origin. A fascinating song, yet very accessible. Line-up: Probyn Gregory: harmonica, lead vocal / Eric Van Den Brink: instruments, background vocals
"Time Will Show The Wiser" (Emitt Rhodes) – Both Emitt Rhodes and Iain Matthews previously recorded this Rhodes-original early on in their careers, the song being starting points as well as signature works for The Merry-Go-Round and Fairport Convention respectively. This new recording unites the two singers in an Indian musical setting. Line-up: Eric Van Den Brink: instruments, vocals / Iain Matthews: lead vocals / Emitt Rhodes: vocals / Matt Malley: mohan veena / Iason Chronis: violin
"Mister Bob" (Eric Van Den Brink, Micky Dolenz, Dave Jones, Peter Tork, Michael Nesmith) – "Mister Bob" features the voices of The Monkees. It's a new song produced under license from Rhino Entertainment, containing vocal samples from the band's recording "Zilch". Line-up: Micky Dolenz: vocal / Davy Jones: vocal / Peter Tork: vocal / Michael Nesmith: vocal / Eric Van Den Brink: instruments, background vocals
"You’re Wrong" (Paul Jones) – The first studio rendition of an up-tempo 'foot tapper' previously performed by Paul Jones in concert only. Line-up: Paul Jones: harmonica, vocal / Eric Van Den Brink: instruments
"La Tête Bat" (Eric Van Den Brink, Cucchilou) – Guitars galore and a funky drum track lay the foundation of the French song within this collection. An Oriental flavour surfaces in the song's coda. Line-up: Eric Van Den Brink: instruments, vocals / Abe Laboriel Jr.: drums (courtesy of Spectrasonics) / Chanteuse Girl: vocal / Atsuko Kurokawa: vocal
"Now Sue" (Gerry Beckley) – This piece of ‘new millennium Country rock' offers an up-tempo approach to an original ballad by Gerry Beckley, who sings lead here. Also adding his distinguishable vocal touch is Jeffrey Foskett. Line-up: Gerry Beckley: lead vocals, background vocals / Jeffrey Foskett: background vocals / Eric Van Den Brink: instruments, additional background vocals
"On 42nd Street" (Eric Van Den Brink, E.H. Roelfzema) – A jazzy ballad with lyrics by poet E.H. Roelfzema, painting a picture of desolation amid a New York night scene. Line-up: Eric Van Den Brink: instruments, lead vocal / E.H. Roelfzema: harmonica, spoken vocal / Frank Verhey: piano / Carl Fischer: trumpet
"You’re Wrong Again" (Paul Jones) – The alternate version of “You’re Wrong” sees more of a bluesy, sultry kind of approach to the song. Line-up: Paul Jones: harmonica, vocal / Eric Van Den Brink: instruments
"Agaraga" (E. Van Den Brink; adapted from a Traditional bhajan by Mansur Mastana) – An Indian flavored piece of World/Rave music, offering an interesting fusion of musical blends. Incorporating Hindi vocals, violin, mohan veena and sitars, it ranges 'from devotional to dance'. Line-up: Janaki: vocals / Eric Van Den Brink: instruments / Iason Chronis: violin / Matt Malley: mohan veena
"Bob's Day Off" (Eric Van Den Brink) – An instrumental bonus track. Line-up: Eric Van Den Brink: instruments

Music Publishers: 1: Coppa Music Ltd./EMI Music Publishing Ltd. [prs]; 2: Red Eft Music [bmi]/Brinker Music Publishing [stemra]; 3: Emitt R. Music/Almo Music [ascap]; 4: Brinker Music Publishing [stemra]/Screen Gems-EMI Music, Inc. [bmi]; 5 & 9: Hornall Brothers Music Ltd. [prs]; 6, 10 & 11: Brinker Music Publishing [stemra]; 7: Human Nature Music [ascap]; 8: Brinker Music Publishing [stemra]/E.H. Roelfzema [stemra]

All selections: arranged by Eric Van Den Brink, except track 2: arranged by Probyn Gregory and Eric Van Den Brink. Recording engineers include Matt Malley, Julia Wolff, Hank Linderman, Bill Gautier, Coen Berrier, Hank Cicalo, Chip Douglas, and Dan Duskin.

References

External links
Paul Jones
Matt Malley
Iain Matthews
Gerry Beckley
Probyn Gregory
Emitt Rhodes Band
Nick Vernier Band

2010 albums
Collaborative albums
Nick Vernier Band albums